Memnonia or Memnonium may refer to:

Places 
 Memnonia quadrangle, a region of Mars
 Memnonia Institute, defunct health institute in Yellow Springs, Ohio, opened by Mary Gove Nichols
 Monuments in Egypt described by Strabo (XVII.42) as a Memnonium
 the Labyrinth
 sites in Abydos
 sites in Thebes
 Memnonium, name used by travelers and visitors to Thebes, Egypt for the ruins of the Ramesseum around 1750-1850 (including variants like Temple of Memnon or Memnonia)

Taxonomy
 Memnonia (bug), a leafhopper genus in the subfamily Deltocephalinae
 Bactrocera memnonia, a fruit fly species in the genus Bactrocera
 Castianeira memnonia, a large brown-black clubionid spider species in the genus Castianeira
 Rhynchosia memnonia, a plant species in the genus Rhynchosia
 Memnonium (fungus), a genus of fungi in the Piedraiaceae family